Ferrioxalate or trisoxalatoferrate(III) is a trivalent anion with formula .  It is a transition metal complex consisting of an iron atom in the +3 oxidation state and three bidentate oxalate ions  anions acting as ligands.

The ferrioxalate anion gives a lime green color to salts, and in solution it is fluorescent.  The anion is sensitive to light and higher-energy electromagnetic radiation, which causes the decomposition of one oxalate to carbon dioxide and reduction of the iron(III) atom to iron(II).  This property is exploited for actinometry.

The most common and most-studied salt is potassium ferrioxalate, but the sodium, ammonium, and lithium salts have also received some attention.

Properties

Stability
In the absence of light or other radiation, the ferrioxalate complex is quite stable.  The potassium and sodium salts and their solutions can be heated to near 100 °C for hours without significant decomposition.

Molecular structure
The complex is held together by dative covalent bonds, due to the oxygen atoms in the oxalate anions (the "ligands") donating a lone pair to the p and d orbitals of the iron atom (the "center" of the complex). The center has three electrons in its d orbitals, leaving 13 empty places in the remaining d and p orbitals. Twelve of these are filled by electrons from the ligands.

The iron center in the ferrioxalate anion has a distorted octahedral geometry. The ferrioxalate complex has D3 molecular symmetry, within which the six Fe–O bond distances all close to 2.0 Å which indicates that the Fe(III) is high spin; as the low spin complex would display Jahn–Teller distortions. The ammonium and mixed sodium-potassium salts are isomorphous, as are related complexes with Al3+, Cr3+, and V3+.

Chirality
The ferrioxalate complex displays helical chirality as it can form two non-superimposable geometries. In accordance with the IUPAC convention, the isomer with the left-handed screw axis is assigned the Greek symbol Λ (lambda). Its mirror image with the right-handed screw axis is given the Greek symbol Δ (delta).

Reactions

Photoreduction
In solution, the ferrioxalate complex undergoes photoreduction. The iron centre is reduced (gains an electron) from the +3 to the +2 oxidation state, while an oxalate ion is oxidised to carbon dioxide:
 2 []3− + hν → 2 []2− + 2  + 
This reaction provides an efficient chemical method for photometry and actinometry, the measurement of light and higher-energy electromagnetic radiation.  Potassium ferrioxalate is over 1000 times more sensitive than uranyl oxalate, the compound previously used for these purposes.

While the complex itself is insensitive to neutrons, the lithium salt can be used to measure them.  A lithium-6 nucleus can absorb a neutron and emit alpha particle  and a triton  with high energies, which presumably  decompose the nearby ferrioxalate.

See also
Sodium ferrioxalate
Iron(III) oxalate

References 

Anions
Iron complexes
Oxalato complexes
Light-sensitive chemicals